This article lists the characters seen on the 3D CGI animated television series Hot Wheels Battle Force 5.

Main

Battle Force 5
Battle Force 5 are the main protagonists in the series, led by Sage and Vert Wheeler as the field commander. Their headquarters are located in Vert's garage (which features an underground level called "The Hub"). Each vehicle has an identification modulator, molecular bonding mode, magnetic Battle Key grapplers, and a com-link system, and is powered by a Sentient conversion chip. These chips can be exchanged between cars and can upgrade other vehicles. Sage only has five of these chips, so normally, only five vehicles can operate through a Storm Shock portal (though all seven vehicles can operate at the same time, just not in a Battle Zone). Each member is equipped with a G-Force resistant Battle Suit called a Shocksuit which protects him or her from impact and also contains a communicator and air-con units to keep the driver cool in hot, humid environments. In order to bond with the vehicle, each driver must name it.

Primary members

 Vert Wheeler (voiced by Mark Hildreth) - Field Commander of the Battle Force 5. Sometime before the series, he and A.J. Dalton were close friends, sharing a love for extreme sports. He's also a fan of Dan Wheldon and an auto racing lover since childhood. After finding his way into a Battle Zone, Vert rescued Sage from the Vandals. She, in exchange, upgrades his vehicle. Vert also wields a sword and has a special pair of sunglasses that function as a computer. Skilled in strategic planning and combat, he is able to focus even under extreme mental or physical distress, channeling energy caused by stress to his benefit rather than hindering him. While always up for a fun time, experience has taught him to take things seriously when the situation demands it. He's a dynamic and understanding individual who retains unwavering trust in his team and a very capable leader. In "Unite and Strike," he wins the Sentient war and becomes leader of the Sentient Council of Five at the end of the Second Season. He is the legendary "Crimson One", the person who will end the war between Blue and Red Sentients. This Vert is an alternate version of the character who appeared in the World Race and Acceleracers series. Vert's battle vehicle is called The Saber, as it can flip open its hood and reveal a powerful chainsaw like blade. The Vert in this show even had a Power Rage car similar to his Acceleracers counterpart.
 Agura Ibaden (voiced by Kathleen Barr) - BF5's Special Operations Officer, second in command, and Hunter. The tomboy female member of Battle Force 5. Her favorite hobby is off-road driving and was brought into BF5 under the pretense of taking part in an off-road race. She finds Stanford very "obnoxious" and the two get into fights, though this tendency begins to diminish after "Cold as Ice." Her pet peeve is being referred to in any way as weak and/or especially helpless. She has excellent tracking and hunting skills, and also possesses formidable hand-to-hand abilities and athleticism, allowing her to defeat even Kyburi. While she can get easily angered when annoyed, she has methods of staying calm and focuses on the task at hand. She apparently has 5 brothers as revealed in "The Blue Tide"' and a 3 year old nephew in "Gladiators." Agura's battle vehicle is called the Tangler, it has a small but strong grapple claw. The Tangler can also turn any of its wheels into claws, that can be used for grabbing and climbing. Agura's voice actress, Kathleen Barr, previously voiced Gelorum, the main antagonist of the World Race and Acceleracers series.
 Sherman and Spinner Cortez (voiced by Brian Drummond and Gabe Khouth) - BF5's Strategic Tactical Support, Tech Support, and Muscle. Spinner is the older, shorter twin brother, acts immature, and is marked by hacking skills and hand-eye coordination. He's very adept at video games and is able to manipulate computer programs. Sherman is the younger, taller twin brother, is more level-headed, intelligent, and physically stronger. He's shown to have impressive technological and engineering skills and has studied Sentient culture in depth (though not as much as Tezz). Both joined BF5 when they thought they were attending a video game convention. Spinner can also control the other vehicles via remote control as shown in Spawn Hunters. The brothers vehicle is called the Buster. It can launch multiple chain maces, spikes from its wheels, and a launch ramp.
 Stanford Isaac Rhodes IV (voiced by Noel Johansen) - BF5's Artillery Expert. The oldest team member and part of the British Royal Family, the 189th in line for the throne. He loves to party, but hates the planet Vandal from his experiences there and puzzles are not his strong point. He has an ancestor that once explored the Multiverse and was also very superstitious, as he believes his Great Uncle Stansted comes to haunt a member of the Royal Family every year, until Sage helped him deal with the issue. Owing to his royal roots, Stanford tends to be arrogant, isn't used to doing things for himself, and gets insecure when he makes a mistake, though he later learns independence and becomes more reliable as time goes on. He was tricked into coming with a false invitation to a party, but later agrees to becoming a member of BF5. Stanford's battle vehicle is called the Reverb. The Reverb has flip out sonic cannons under its hood, and it can echo locate an area, and can transfer the map to any other Battle Vehicle.
 Zoom Takazumi (voiced by Alessandro Juliani) - BF5's Scout. The youngest team member and a skilled Muay Thai fighter from Bangkok, Thailand. He is athletic, restless, and curious, but is willing to fight for the sake of the Earth. He dislikes ice, cold weather, lectures, and being called "kid". He also looks up to Vert like an older brother, which led to trouble when he imitates him early on. His helmet is equipped with scanning devices to help in his scouting duties and can be adapted to allow him to breathe underwater. Zoom was originally a chosen guardian from the Order of the Flying Fists, a school of elite martial arts warriors, but he abandoned it for a new life in the outside world. He was brought into the BF5 after accepting what he thought was an invitation to the World's Mixed-Martial Arts Championship. Zoom's Vehicle is called the Chopper. It can small blades from both its front and back wheels that can act like saw blades. It can also split its wheels into four smaller wheels and fly.

Secondary members
 Sage (voiced by Kira Tozer) - A female Blue Sentient, BF5's advisor and leader, and Krytus' twin sister. She can turn into a small dodecahedron to hibernate and happened to be the last Blue Sentient due to an intervention by Rawkus. She can fire an electric shock to stun enemies and levitate. Later, Sage upgrades her systems and gains a "human-friendly" sense of humor. When her memory was fully restored, she regained the ability to modify Battle Keys (program a Key to take a driver to a different Battle Zone/Planet instead of its programmed Zone). Sage has a weak telepathic link to Krytus, which she uses to track him down, but refrained from communication to prevent him from finding Earth's coordinates. She was unaware that she possessed the lost minds of her race within her subconscious. As Vert, Zoom, and Rawkus were the only ones who knew, they could not tell her this. If she had learned that the minds were there, they would have been released prematurely, and lost forever. In "The Crimson One" and "Blast from the Past," she had sent the BF5 into the past to make certain history unfolded the way it was supposed to. In "Better Off Red," it is revealed that Sage is in process of creating a weapon that will be used against an enemy even more dangerous than her brother and the Red Sentients. In "Unite and Strike," she is killed by Kyburi, but downloaded her mind into BF5's vehicles, which were then used by BF5 to fight their way through the Red Sentient 5 to eventually restore her race and herself. She later assists in setting up a new peace with the Red Sentients and banished her brother, becoming a member of the Council of Five at the end.
 Tezz Volitov (voiced by Noel Johansen) - Joins in The Power of Resistance. A scientific genius of European origin with a Russian accent and expertise in Electromagnetism. Years ago during an experiment, the speed and energy his engine put out created a portal and stranded him on a Red Sentient moon. Honing his knowledge of Sentient culture based on the Data Logs he recovered, he fought back against the Red Sark as the sole rebel there. Tezz is brought back to Earth by Stanford, where he receives his suit and vehicle upgrade to assist the team. He also wields a gauntlet which can emit electromagnetic fields and fire EMP blasts, as well as remotely control his vehicle. Tezz has great pride in his intelligence, which tends to make him arrogant and a loner. As a result, it is difficult for him to admit his faults, express his feelings, understand expressions, and work with others. Furthermore, his scientific curiosity often puts him into dangerous situations. Underneath it all, he is a very capable man who accepts the group as his "slightly-less intelligent" family. He does display a more sensitive side toward others with high intellect, such as the Kharamanos, especially with Tromp. At the end of "Rumble in the Jungle," he vows to return Tromp home after leaving him to detonate a bomb. In "Unite and Strike," this is apparently achieved as Tromp is seen along with all others after the Blue Sentients are restored. Tezz's battle vehicle is called the Splitwire that harness Electromagnetism in the form of a crossbow and blasts. It can also drive on metallic objects and surfaces, and also levitate.
 A.J. Dalton (voiced by Michael Dobson) - First mentioned in "Cold as Ice" and joins in "Deep Freeze." He's a Canadian survival and terrain expert hailing from the Yukon. Before Battle Force 5, he and Vert were close friends. Both have a love for extreme sports, which is evident by A.J.'s energy and enthusiasm. Vert calls him over for help years later in retrieving a Terraforming Pod in the Ice Battle Zone. He is overly-friendly, honest, and optimistic, though he can be wise when need be. He is not very comfortable in hot climates, in contrast to Agura and Zoom. A.J.’s battle vehicle is called the Gearslammer. It can drive on ice, and can block any type of ballistic attack because of its super tough shell. It also has a high powered drill that can puncture almost any substance.

Villains

The Vandals
The Vandals (also called Vandalians) are a race of anthropomorphic tribal animals from the planet Vandal who have also occupied the Blue Sentient planet. Unlike the Sark, the Vandals are driven by aggression and value strength gained through combat above all else. While the Sark conquer worlds, the Vandals loot and vandalize them enslaving their inhabitants for their necessities. The position of Vandal Warlord is decided by a ritual (trial by combat) called Kio Hakoko. Even in everyday life, the slightest insult is settled through fighting. Apparently, they are also very superstitious and often explain unknown things due to sources of magic. Owing to their dependence on scavenged Sentient technology and their enslavement of the Kharamanos, their war machines were destroyed in "Rumble in the Jungle" when a bomb was detonated at their power source, thereby robbing them of their ability to ravage other worlds. Currently with no technology, the only way to access planet Vandal is with a Battle Key.

 Captain Kalus (voiced by Colin Murdock) - The liger-like Vandal Warlord of the planet Vandal. He uses a crossbow mounted on his right arm. He also has a wide assortment of spears, axes, and throwing projectiles. Kalus considers humans and other races inferior and while he rules over the Vandals through fear and intimidation, he does respect and value those who are loyal to his lead. He is also shown to have aquaphobia and gets seasick easily, since he very closely resembles a cat. After the final defeat of the Vandals, Kalus is last seen approaching a captured Grimian with a spear implying that he will do away with him. He has shown extremely good hand-to-hand combat prowess being able to go head to head with Krytus. Kalus' vehicle is a chariot-like vehicle called Fangore.
 Krocomodo (voiced by Brian Drummond) - A crocodile-like Vandal who is Kalus' second-in-command. He once planned to overthrow Kalus and take control of the Vandals as leader, but gives up when Kalus discovered his intentions. It was later revealed that his ancestors and Stanford's ancestors started the war between the Vandals and Sentients. Krocomodo is also adaptable to water environments, though not as much as Sever. When Grimian was appointed to his position as second-in-command, Krocomodo was temporarily demoted to third-in-command until Grimian's banishment and eventual execution, thus returning him to second-in-command. His vehicle is Riptile.
 Sever (voiced by Colin Murdock) - A shark-like Vandal. Sever has a keen sense of smell which allows him to detect life forms from a mile away, similar to Krocomodo's. However, he isn't very bright, especially since he often thinks about food. So far, he is the only Vandal on the team who has not tried to overthrow Kalus. In the Vandal Ocean, Sever leads a team of shark-beings like himself called the Aqua-Jaws, and can communicate with them using high-pitched screeches similar to a whale. His vehicle is Water Slaughter.
 Hatch (voiced by Kathleen Barr) - A cockroach-like Vandal who is arguably the most intellectual of the team. It is shown that he is an expert in making crude electronics as well as poisons and chemicals and is able to perform black magic, which he actually confuses with science and technology. His position is a sorcerer, though most of his 'spells' are actually bits of Sark and Sentient devices he had scavenged. Hatch is capable of creating a magical aura with his antennas that makes him (and others) as he pleases invisible to insects. Hatch is cowardly and sycophantic and will not hesitate to grovel in the event of a new leader, though he does show more loyalty to Kalus. His vehicle is Scarib which is made from the bones of larger creatures, has a scorpion-like stinger, and has grappling cables.
 Iguanarox - Former leader of the Vandals who was defeated by Kalus before the events of the series and presumably either dead or exiled. He was only mentioned in "Behind Enemy Lines."
 Vandal Warriors - Kalus's soldiers. The soldiers seen so far are Felines, Crocodiles, Sharks, Insectoids, and Apes.

The Sark
The Sark are a race of deadly robots from the planet Sark, as well as occupying the Red Sentient planet. Their entire existence is based on logic and the conquest of other worlds. They were created to be an army for the Red Sentients, but Zemerik rebelled against Krytus and took control of the Sark until Krytus was freed from the Krypt Zone. After the events of Get Zemerik, Blue Sark no longer exist. Currently, Red Sark still remain, though no longer aggressive due to the new alliance between the Red and Blue Sentients. It is possible the Red Sentients did not create the Sark, but merely found the schematics for them because of the existence of a Factory Battle Zone older than the Sentients themselves. Additionally, the Alpha Code and the Old Sark of the Badlands point to a more ancient origin. Considering these facts, it is actually more likely that The Ancient Ones created the Sark. They are somewhat similar to the Racing Drones from Acceleracers.

 Zemerik (voiced by Michael Dobson) - The leader of the Sark with an Electric Whip for combat. He also has the ability to turn Red Zurk to his command, though the Red Sentients can turn them back. Zemerik's head can also operate independently when separated from his body. He emphasizes logic and considers organic beings inferior. Originally built to lead a Red Sark Army, in "The Crimson One," it is revealed that Zemerik gained free will after Vert was sent back in time and uploaded a virus, which allowed Zemerik to betrayal Krytus, imprison the RS5, and turn the Sark blue. Presently, he has no memory of Vert during that time (possibly due to a side effect of the virus). Zemerik and Zug were the only Sark not under Red Sentient control. In "The Blue Tide," they attempted to create a Blue Sark Army resistant to conversion, but the plan failed when the BF5 shut down the Factory Battle Zone that was manufacturing them, thereby forcing Zemerik and Zug back into hiding. In "Get Zemerik," he was reprogrammed by a band of Green Zurk, and underwent a radical personality change as well as a slight physical change, which involved his eyes going green and the symbol representing the Alpha Code engraved into his forehead. He then was terminated by Krytus and thrown into a pit. His final fate is undetermined with the appearance of the Old Sark of the Badlands who resurrects the former dictator. Zemerik's vehicle is Zelix.
 Zug (voiced by Brian Drummond) - Zemerik's second-in-command. Zug is very strong and has three drill fingers on his left hand, but is somewhat slow-witted. Aside from Zemerik, Zug is the only Sark with free will, and his primary mission is to follow and serve Zemerik, even at the cost of his own existence. Like Stanford, Zug hates the planet Vandal. He was also the first Sark turned blue after Zemerik gains free will. He was deactivated in the Toborian Badlands after being badly damaged by an ion storm and giving his power core to Zemerik, though his body was taken by the Green Zurk and dumped into the pit with his fallen master. His final fate remains to be seen. Zug's vehicle is Zendrill which has a drill in front of it.
 Zurk - Common and disposable minions for Zemerik and later Krytus, they make up most of the Sark population. There are 2 types of Zurk: The Humanoid versions that drive the Zentners and the small wheeled versions, or Mini-Zurk, which roll about on their own. Generally, Zurk are mindless and will even destroy themselves if ordered to do so. However, if a Red Sentient is nearby, Zemerik's control over the Zurk is overridden, upon which they turn red and use more aggressive tactics. They speak in a series of beeps and robotic noises, but in one of the webisodes it is revealed that they know the terms "Warning" and "Intruder alert".
 Sark Sentries - Small flying scout devices that patrol the Sark Homeworld in the first season and patrol for the Red Sentients in the second season. There are larger versions armed with blasters, used for hunting.
 Alpha Sark - Discovered in "Get Zemerik," these outcast and obsolete green Zurk were banished to the Torborian Badlands by Zemerik long ago. Remarkably, not only were they able to survive there, they even gained intelligence and built a hive-city of their own. They also established a cult that worships something known only as the "Alpha-Code", which makes them immune to any attempts at conversion by Zemerik and presumably the Red Sentients. They wear cloaks wrapped around their heads like hoods and carry electro-staves. They are also able to speak, and operate individually.
 Alpha Code - A corrupt program or virus that turns Sark green, making them Alpha Sark. The affected consider this code "enlightenment". It first appears in "Get Zemerik," where Zemerik (and possibly Zug as well) gets infected by it. It could be possible that it might convert Red or Blue Sentients into Green/Alpha Sentients.
 Zorax (voiced by Brian Dobson) - Originally thought to be no more than a myth, this ancient robot appears to be the leader of the Green/Alpha Sark. He is seen at the end of "Get Zemerik" in the pit Zemerik and Zug were thrown into where he resurrects Zemerik as his new servant. He is the main antagonist of "Full Revolution."
 Generic Sark - The unnamed Sark seen on their planet come in different colors. The Blue Sark serve the Blue Sentients, the Red Sark serve the Red Sentients, the Green Sark serve the Karmordials, the Purple Sark serve the Red Sentients and the Blue Sentients, and the Yellow Sark only appear in "Blue Tide" and resemble Tors-10.

Krytus' Red Sentient 5
Krytus' personal team, which is basically the Red Sentient equivalent of the Battle Force 5. It is possible that Sage had created the BF5 based on the RS5 or was inspired by the events of Blast from the Past. Unlike the rest of the Red Sentient population, they were off-planet during the time Sage had used the Double-Helix Crystals to freeze the Red Sentients. Krytus's team was imprisoned by Zemerik, but later freed by Krytus once he escaped the Krypt Zone. Each member can form his/her own vehicle with special properties similar to BF5's. Their main shared weakness is through breaking their crystal shells and releasing their antimatter energy. Because of this, Krytus made "Re-Spawn" chambers for him and his team so that if any of them are destroyed, they will revive in them. In Better Off Red, Vert tricked Krytus into revealing how this process is done, and that there could be hidden Blue Sentient Re-Spawn chambers as well. Any one of them can turn Blue Sark into Red ones and override Zemerik's control, however, Zemerik can turn them back.

 Krytus (voiced by Brian Drummond) - Leader of the Red Sentient 5, Vert's counterpart, and Sage's twin brother. He once he tried to kill Sage, but was stopped by Rawkus, and as a result, made her the last blue Sentient until her people were restored. Krytus possesses high amounts of strength and has the ability to form blades from his hands. He created Zemerik to lead his army, until Zemerik turned on Krytus and imprisoned him in the Krypt Zone. Owing to Zemerik's betrayal, he harbored an intense hatred for his once-loyal creation. Neither he nor the other members of the RS5 seem to remember Vert's involvement in Zemerik's betrayal, though Krytus vaguely remembers the BF5 in Blast from the Past. Because they are twins, Krytus and Sage share a weak telepathic link, which Sage uses to locate him. Though physically stronger, his mental powers are weaker than Sage's. After being forced to work together in "Shadow Runners," Krytus admits a grudging respect for Vert and calls him by his name, rather than just "human". In "Get Zemerik," he finally got the chance to terminate Zemerik, but felt cheated out of revenge when Zemerik's new personality "forgave" him. In "Unite and Strike," he destroys a Battle Zone in order to create an intense beta-decay wave, which was capable of not only reaching the Red Sentient homeworld, but also undoing the stasis field that trapped his people, thus freeing them. However, his plans for conquest come to naught as the Blue and Red Sentients, weary of eons of fighting, agree to a new peace and Krytus is forever banished into stasis to a frozen wasteland on a distant planet. His vehicle is Syfurious. The Syfurious has 4 blades, two large ones in the front, and two short ones in the back.
 Kytren (voiced by Michael Dobson) - RS5's Scout, Zoom's counterpart, and Sol's twin brother. Unlike the other Red Sentients, he has a tendency to speak in brief sentence fragments, due to his savage nature. In Total Revolution, it is revealed that the Red Sentient 5 shared the same fate as Krytus. His vehicle is Vylirex which can drive into the ground and reappear in any location.
 Kyburi (voiced by Kathleen Barr) - RS5's Special Operations Officer and Agura's counterpart. Short-tempered and cruel, she is Krytus's First Lieutenant and Hunter. She has the special ability to drain energy from machines and living beings. She is especially antagonistic toward Agura. In Total Revolution, it is revealed that the Red Sentient 5 shared the same fate as Krytus. Her vehicle is Venikus which is an all-terrain vehicles with energy-draining "fangs" on the front and sports a stealth mode.
 Krylox (voiced by Colin Murdock) - RS5's Strategic Tactical and Tech Support and counterpart to the Cortez brothers. Krylox is a large, hulking Red Sentient with incredible strength and the ability to duplicate himself. He is brutal, arrogant, and prefers to solve all his problems by smashing things with his fists or his vehicle. His weakness is that if one duplicate is damaged, the other will be damaged in the same place as well. In Total Revolution, it is revealed that the Red Sentient 5 shared the same fate as Krytus. His vehicle is Synataur which is a tank-like vehicle that can split apart.
 Kyrosys (voiced by Mark Hildreth) - RS5's Artillery Expert and Stanford's counterpart. He is taciturn and very methodical. In Total Revolution, it is revealed that the Red Sentient 5 shared the same fate as Krytus. His vehicle is Synthrax.

Minions
 Tors-10 (voiced by Michael Dobson) - A mysterious, deranged and maniacal Red Sark who was in control of the Colosseum Battle Zone. He lived up in a tower over the arena, from which he conducted tests and experiments. He called himself the "design master" of a Sark vehicle testing facility. Using a device that stimulates high levels of aggression, he forced the Vandals and the BF5 to fight against each other and their own teammates to determine which of their vehicles' designs was "worthy" of the superior beings he claimed to represent. He was ultimately destroyed when he initiated the Battle Zone's self-destruct sequence as a last resort. When confiding with Sage about it later, Vert was informed that Tors-10 might only be a minion working for an unknown threat even greater than the Sark and Vandals. This was confirmed to be the Red Sentients, as it was revealed in Legacy that the project was a Red Sentient Mobias Command Center with mobile Re-Spawn Chambers. The project was destroyed by the BF5.
 Red Zurk - First seen in "Ascent of the Red Sentients Part 2." All Sark, including Zemerik and Zug were red and under the control of the Red Sentients, until Zemerik was turned blue by Sage's virus. With the return of Krytus and the Red Sentient 5, every blue Zurk except for Zemerik and Zug was turned back to red.
 Grimian (voiced by Scott McNeil) - A gorilla-like Vandal who first appears in "Uprising." A brutal Vandal, he also wants to take over as Vandal Warlord. Unlike Hatch and Krocomodo, he will try to do so at any cost. After Kalus defeated him, he appointed Grimian to second-in-command. However, it turns out that Grimian is secretly working for Krytus. How they allied is revealed in the webisode "Secret Alliance." While fighting, Krytus proposed a chance to overthrow Kalus by working with him. Grimian took up the offer as Krytus was choosing whether to spare him from falling over a cliff. In "Grimian's Secret," his treason is revealed to Kalus and he is banished from the Vandal Hordes. However, in Rumble in the Jungle, he makes one final alliance with the Red Sentients and rallies those who are loyal to him to start a Vandal civil war. In the end, Grimian is defeated and captured, with his life most likely ended by Kalus himself as Kalus was seen approaching him with a spear in his hand. His vehicle is Prime Evil.

The Ancient Ones
They were first mentioned in Better Off Red, referred to in that episode as the "Greater Enemy" and that Sage is constructing a weapon that will be used against them. But in "Unite and Strike!," they were referred to by name by Rawkus, who asked Battle Force 5 to ride with him to combat them into darkness. As shown by constellations at the end of the episode: one of them looks like a dragon, one looks like an Octopus, one looks like he is made out of fire or ice, and one looks like a huge gargoyle. Owing to the series' cancellation, the true appearance of the Ancient Ones was never revealed until the "Full Revolution" movie. The Ancient Ones, whose names are revealed to be The Karmordials, were the first beings to every exist in the Multiverse. They created both the Red and Blue Sentients. But as the Sentients continued to evolve, the Karmordials grew jealous. They then declared war on their creations. They were defeated The Penta Warriors, Elite Warriors that were Blue and Red Sentient Hybrids, and sealed with the Primordiverse.

Other characters
 Zeke (voiced by Colin Murdock) - The owner of the local diner the team often visits. Zeke is an enthusiastic believer in aliens and a Science Fiction fan. His antics in pursuing proof to his beliefs have led him into trouble more than once. As of late, he remains unaware of the Battle Force 5's true mission. Apparently, in a flashback in Legacy, it is revealed that his obsession over aliens could have been due to the actions of Jack Wheeler.
 Grace (voiced by Kira Tozer) - The waitress of Zeke's diner and the intended love interest for Stanford and Vert. Zoom doesn't seem too interested in her, but when he missed a Storm Shock portal, they went to the movies together.
 Sheriff Johnson (voiced by Brian Drummond and Brian Dobson) - The local authority who is always trying to pin Vert down. He considers the group a rag tag band of possible delinquents. Though he believes their cover as vehicle test drivers, he doesn't approve of their antic activities on his watch.
 Simon Ian Rhodes II (voiced by Alan Marriott) - Debuts in Stormshocker. Stanford's older brother who has a condescending attitude toward his sibling, due to the fact that he is better at all things and gets more attention. As a result, he is more arrogant and does not consider the consequences of his actions. However, he is completely unaware of Stanford's role as part of Battle Force 5. He was also mentioned by Dan in Full Throttle and by Stanford in Sol Survivor.
 Negative Kalus - Appears in "Double Down." Good opposite of the original Captain Kalus from a parallel universe. His armor is white and new looking, instead of grey and battle-scarred. He also carries his crossbow on his left arm. Unlike his counterpart, he upholds honor in a much higher regard and will not kill an unarmed opponent. He fights as a loner as the good versions of Hatch, Krocomodo and Sever were killed by the evil version of the BF5.
 Zen (voiced by Kathleen Barr) - Debuts in "The Chosen One." A student of the Order of the Flying Fists, he at first comes to try to get Zoom to go back to the Order, but allows him to stay following a successful Battle Key run. He later returns in "Mouth of the Dragon" once he learns of the rift that connected Earth to the Red Sentient planet. He later makes an appearance with Tromp at the end of "Unite and Strike."
 Rawkus (voiced by Mark Acheson) - Debuts in "Stone Cold Warrior." A gigantic stone elemental with no allegiance to good or evil. He has massive strength, durability, and wields a sickle which has total control over rock. He also has limited powers of space and time manipulation that he only uses in extreme emergencies. He is known as the Eternal Equalizer, whose mission is to maintain the balance of the Multiverse by making certain that no one faction dominates it completely. It was because of him that Sage was saved from her brother and became the last Blue Sentient until her people were restored. He is powered by his Power Core Stone but can use a Sentient Chip in an emergency. He has also met with Master Takeyasu. He later brings Vert and Zoom to the Shadow Zone in order to have them find the lost Blue Sentient minds and eventually restore the balance of the Multiverse. He also appears in "Blast from the Past" as the referee in the ancient Sentient gladiatorial games. In "Unite and Strike," he provided the coordinates to the Blue Sentient Shells and instigated the events that led to the Blue/Red Sentient Alliance, thereby maintaining the balance. At the end of the episode, he watches the Battle Force 5 from a distance and commends them for restoring the balance of the Multiverse. He then talks about how the Battle Force 5 will face even greater challenges in the near future as well as the coming of the 'Ancient Ones'.
 Dan Wheldon (voiced by himself) - Debuts in Full Throttle. A pro racer and Indy 500 champion, Dan was trying to perfect a maneuver called the 1260 ricochet on the BF5's test track but was later recruited to help destroy a Red Sentient scanner. As a kid Dan always wanted to fight aliens and Vert relates with wanting to race in a race car. At the end of the episode, he was given a communicator by Sage and was made an honorary member of the BF5. After Dan Wheldon was killed in a crash during the IZOD IndyCar World Championship race in Las Vegas on October 16, 2011, the television film "Full Revolution" was dedicated in his memory.
 Negative BF5 - Appear in "Double Down." Evil opposites of the original primary members of BF5 from a parallel universe. They each have their Sentient ranking symbols painted below their left eye.
 Shadow Speeders - Debut in "The Shadow Zone." Lost Multiverse travelers who remained in the Shadow Zone too long and became mindless shadow raiders. Their only purpose is to trap and transform living beings into Shadow Speeders. They are able to move about by defying normal laws of physics and constant contact with them will eventually turn anyone into another Shadow Speeder. Staying within the Shadow Zone too long will also cause a gradual transformation and they can only be destroyed temporarily. They speak in high-pitched hisses and screeches.
 Master Takeyasu (voiced by Scott McNeil) - Debuts in Mouth of the Dragon. Zoom's former teacher in the Order of the Flying Fists, who seems to have prior knowledge of the Sentients and of Krytus. Apparently, he has also met with Rawkus. He is an extraordinary martial artist and is able to hold his own against the Red Sentients. He was last seen on the Red Sentient Homeworld, though he seems to be fine as Sage's telepathic search had found him in deep meditation in Unite and Strike.
 Jack Wheeler - (voiced by Jim Byrnes) - Debuts in Legacy. Vert's father, who had accidentally found the Multiverse through a Stormshock Portal. Impressed by the alien technology, he built the Spectra Motors hangar, hoping to find another Stormshock and more technology. He was later captured and enslaved by Tors-10, and his hangar was inherited by his son and became the Hub. After Tors-10's destruction, he traveled the Multiverse where he eventually met up with his son and his team. They return to destroy the Red Sentient Mobi that Tors-10 was building. It is later found that Jack Wheeler could not return to Earth, due to a cellular tracking beacon within him. Currently, he is still traveling the Multiverse, fighting as a lone rebel, though he may be able to return to Earth after the events of Unite and Strike.

Sentients
Sentients are highly evolved energy lifeforms that created the Battle Zones, the Battle Keys, and the Multiverse many years ago. There are two factions, Blue and Red. Blue Sentients such as Sage are benevolent, while Red Sentients like Krytus are destructive.

Blue Sentients
The Blue Sentients are a benevolent race of highly generated energetic aliens who created the Multiverse. After their world was taken over by the Vandals, the Blue Sentient Council of Five downloaded the knowledge of their civilization into Data Logs and spread them throughout the Multiverse. Thanks to the efforts of the BF5, they are reborn at the end of the second season and have charted a new peace with the Red Sentients.

 Boralis (voiced by Michael Dobson) - An ally of Sage who assigned his servant, Quardian, to collect several hundred Blue Sentient shells before dying, so that they may someday be reunited with their minds. In "Unite and Strike," he is revived, and is shown to be different from his shell. He appears to be missing an eye, and has two horns on his head, making it look like he is wearing a helmet.
 Sol (voiced by Michael Dobson) - First and only appeared in "Sol Survivor." Sage's mentor and one of the original members of the Blue Sentient Council of Five. He is also Kytren's twin. After a brutal interrogation from Krytus, Sol was badly damaged while escaping into a deep hibernation mode. The BF5 unknowingly doomed him when he was revived, destroying his ability to recharge. An attempt to use Kytren's Re-Spawn Chamber failed with Sol perishing in a trap, but he left behind his genetic makeup and memories with Sage, indicating that he may be revived.

Red Sentients
The Red Sentients are the war-like "twin race" to the Blue Sentients. Most of the populace was in stasis, but at the end of Rumble in the Jungle, Krytus' team found a way to unfreeze them. However, due to their weariness to the war and their desire to end the fighting, they agree to a new peace with the restored Blue Sentient Race.

 General Kromax - A deceased Red Sentient General who was known for ambush tactics. Krytus and Kyburi used his name as part of a secret code.

Diads
The Diads are artificial silicon beings created to serve the Sentients:

 Praxion Diad (voiced by Mark Hildreth) - First and only appears in "Axis of Evil" Pt. 2. A Diad who appeared to be the only survivor on the Blue Sentient home world. Though seemingly on the side of the Blue Sentients, he turns out to be a traitor gone mad, and frees Krytus from the Krypt Zone. After BF5 returns to Earth, Praxion is dropped off of a cliff by Krytus, who had no further use for him.
 Quardian Diad (voiced by G. Khouth) - First appears in "Found!...And Lost." The Diad servant of Boralis. Boralis' dying command was for Quardian to gather Blue Sentient shells and hide them away, so they will one day be resurrected. While searching for more shells, Quardian is kidnapped by Kyburi and taken back to the Red Sentient planet as a servant. Before he is made to tell Krytus of his mission, the Battle Force 5 rescue him. He is sent back to continue his mission, while Sage erases the memories of the BF5 and her own of Quardian's location and identity in order to protect Quardian's secret. He is seen again in "Unite and Strike," when BF5 came to him so they could download the Blue Sentient minds from Sage's mind into his collection of Blue Sentient shells.

References

Hot Wheels
Hot Wheels
Hot Wheels